Mikhail Petrovich Kulakov (March 29, 1927 in Leningrad – February 10, 2010 in Highland, California, United States) was a Russian adventist pastor, social and religious activist, and Protestant Bible scholar and translator.  He was co-founder of the Russian Branch of the International Association for Religious Freedom  (1992), founder of the Institute for Bible Translation in Zaoksky (Tula Region, Russia), an honorary board member of the Russian Bible Society  , and the head of the Church of Seventh-day Adventists in the Soviet Union (1990—1992). Kulakov's work on translating the Bible into modern Russian language has been lauded by biblical scholars, philologists, theologians and various representatives of Orthodox and Protestant churches in Russia.

Early life 

Mikhail Petrovich Kulakov was born on March 29, 1927 in Leningrad (St. Petersburg)  to the family of a Seventh-day Adventist pastor. In 1928, his family moved to the city of Tula (in Central Russia) when his father, Peter Stepanovich Kulakov, was sent there for pastoral ministry.  During the atheist and authoritarian rule of the Soviet government, the Kulakov family was under the scrutiny of state security bodies. In 1935, his father was arrested for religious activity and the court sentenced him to imprisonment in the camps of Vorkuta, followed by an exile in Siberia.  Following the exile, the Kulakov family moved to the village Krasnyi Klyuch in the Krasnoyarsk Region, where they lived until 1939. After the end of the exile the family moved to Samara and then to Maykop (Adygea, Russia) where they lived until the eve of the Second World War when they relocated to Ivanovo. Here Mikhail Kulakov enrolled in the Ivanovo Art School, from which he graduated in 1947.

In August 1945, Kulakov became a baptized member of the Seventh-day Adventist Church. (As he recalled in his book, “...late at night, far away from the city lights, my father secretly baptised eight people, including me. I was 18 years old...”). Following his baptism, he began to actively assist his father in conducting clandestine worship services and the missionary work. In 1947, his father was arrested again and was given a ten-year sentence. It was then that Kulakov's mother moved him and his siblings to Daugavpils, Latvia. Here, Kulakov continued to work in the church and also taught drawing and painting in the city schools. The peaceful existence was short-lived, and nine months later in March 1948, he was arrested by the KGB along with his elder brother Stephen. After serving six months in prison in Ivanovo, Kulakov was sentenced to five years in the corrective hard labor camps of the U.S.S.R. The first 18 months of his five-year term (1948–1953) he was held in the corrective labor camp in Mordovia (about 400 miles east of Moscow).
Kulakov's brother Stephen was one of the thousands who died in the labor camps near the Far North city of Vorkuta. Despite the many hardships he faced, Kulakov remembered his experiences in the camps as a “life university” and he was grateful that he survived. He also recalled that these years were brightened for him because he had the opportunity to share his faith with the other captives in the camps.

In 1953, his sentence expired and Kulakov was sent into permanent exile in the Kazakh village Myrzykul (Kustanai region). After marrying his wife Anna (née Velgosha) in 1954, he was released from exile under amnesty. In 1955, he and his young family moved to Alma-Ata the former capital of Kazakhstan. It was here that the Kulakov family became actively involved in the Seventh-day Adventist Church ministry despite severe persecution.

Role in the unification and development of the Seventh-day Adventist Church in the Soviet Union 

In 1958, Kulakov was ordained as a minister and was elected head of the Seventh-day Adventist church organization that at the time existed unofficially in the republics of Central Asia, Kazakhstan and the Caucasus.
In the 1960s, the Soviet government continued its persecution of religious organizations despite the external liberalization of some aspects of religious life in the U.S.S.R. Because of this, Kulakov and his family were forced to repeatedly change their place of residence to avoid arrests. In 1960, he moved his family from Almaty to the village of Akkul’ (Dzhambul region), then in 1962 to Kokand and in 1966 to Chimkent (in southern Kazakhstan).

In the late 1960s the General Conference of the Seventh-day Adventist Church  (the supreme governing body of Adventists, located in the U.S.) tried unsuccessfully to establish contacts with the Adventists in the Soviet Union – the activity of the church was then strictly controlled by state authorities. For many decades Seventh-day Adventist living in the Soviet Union could not attend the international meetings of the world church. In 1970 yet another attempt was made to invite a delegation from the Soviet Union to the Adventist World Congress in Detroit but neither Kulakov nor other pastors who had received an invitation were allowed release from the country.

In the fall of 1970, Kulakov was able to visit the U.S. on a private invitation of his aunt, Valentina Popova, then living in California. His trip to the U.S. coincided with the annual meeting of the General Conference of Seventh-day Adventists, to which, Kulakov was invited. This conference was a notable event, because since 1909, none of the Russian Adventist leaders had ever been to the headquarters of the General Conference. The president of the General Conference at the time, Robert Pearson, and other church leaders expressed great interest in the happenings of the Adventists in the Soviet Union. Aware of internal discord and organizational difficulties that prevailed in the church in the area, Seventh-day Adventist Church leaders requested and authorized Kulakov to take responsibility for the reconciliation and unification of disparate groups of Seventh-day Adventist communities in the Soviet Union.

In the years following the visit to the General Conference World Headquarters, Kulakov, driven by his passionate desire to see his beloved church united and vibrant, together with his colleagues in the Central Asian republics and in the Baltic republics, Belarus, Ukraine and Moldova, worked tirelessly to bring about the consolidation of the Seventh-day Adventist communities into one united family. Kulakov devoted over twenty years of his life to the cause of reconciliation and re-unification of the isolated groups of Adventists in the U.S.S.R.

In 1975, along with six other leaders of the church, Kulakov was able to attend the next congress of the General Conference in Vienna, Austria. For the first time, after six decades of isolation and repression, the Seventh-day Adventist Church in the Soviet Union was represented at the World Congress . Kulakov was elected as the member of the Executive Committee of the General Conference  and became a member of the Academy of Adventist Ministers.

Also in 1975, the Seventh-day Adventist Church leaders in Moscow, Tula, Nizhny Novgorod, Leningrad and other Russian cities asked Mikhail P. Kulakov to move from Kazakhstan to the Russian Federation in order to create a single church organization on the territory of the RSFSR.  In response to this request and on the recommendation of the President of the General Conference, Kulakov moved to Russia at the end of 1975 and settled in Tula.

In March 1977, after a 50-year interval, the first official Congress of the Adventists took place in Russia. The aim was to unite disparate groups into one Adventist church organization. At this time M.P. Kulakov was elected as head of the association of Adventist Churches in the Russian Federation. However, the government authorities were slow to permit the establishment of the church organization which would be in full accord with the denominational Working Policy.

The complete re-unification of the splintered groups of Adventists in the Soviet Union was only achieved by the end of 1980, when Kulakov was able to negotiate permission for the official visit to the U.S.S.R. of the General Conference president Neal C. Wilson. On behalf of the Adventist World Church, Wilson communicated to the Adventists in the U.S.S.R. that the General Conference recognized the official leadership of the church in the U.S.S.R. and appealed to the leaders of all factions to join the officially recognized group of Adventists in the U.S.S.R., forming one organization with them.

In 1985, an advisory board was formed at the semi-official meeting of church leaders from all republics of the former Soviet Union. It was a step to unite scattered groups of Adventist believers of the Soviet Union into one organization. Mikhail P. Kulakov (from the Russian Federation) and Nikolai A. Zhukalyuk (from the Ukraine) were elected as the coordinators of this advisory board.  Working closely with the leaders of the church in the various other republics of the U.S.S.R., they worked to re-unite and organize national and local associations of Adventists throughout the Soviet Union as close to the Working Policy of the world church organization as the circumstances at the time would allow.

To recognize Kulakov's role in the unification and organization of the Adventist Church, the Southwestern Adventist College in Texas, USA awarded M.P. Kulakov an Honorary Doctoral Degree in Theology in 1987.

Founding of an educational institution and publishing house 

Mikhail Kulakov, along with his son Mikhail Mikhailovich Kulakov, led in the establishment and development of a theological seminary for the training of pastors in the Seventh-day Adventist Church in the U.S.S.R.  After much effort and intense dialogue with the authorities and government officials, they were able to receive the necessary authorizations. The Kulakov family moved to the village of Zaoksky in 1988, where the first Protestant theological seminary in the country was thus established (currently Zaoksky Theological Seminary) . A few years later under Kulakov leadership, "Source of Life", the first Seventh-day Adventist publishing house in the U.S.S.R., was opened as well .

It was not until 1990   that the Adventists were able to receive the permission of the Soviet government to form the Euro-Asia Division of the world Adventist Church at the 1990  World Congress in Indianapolis, IN and Kulakov was elected as its president.

Public activities 

In the 1970s and 1980s Kulakov, as one of the influential religious leaders in the U.S.S.R., represented the Seventh-day Adventist Church at various public events in the U.S.S.R. and abroad at international conferences in defense of peace. In June 1977, he participated in the World Conference "Religious Leaders for Lasting Peace, Disarmament and Just Relations Among Nations" and in 1982 he was invited to take part in the World Conference "Religious Workers for Saving the Sacred Gift of Life from Nuclear Catastrophe" in Moscow. Kulakov also took part in numerous other Christian Peace conferences, which took place abroad. In 1978 (June 22–27) he traveled to Prague with a delegation of ministers from various religious bodies in the Soviet Union to attend the conference of the Christian Peace Movement. A few years later in 1983 (20–24 April), Kulakov took an active part in the same conference in Sweden in Uppsala (For Life and Peace). In the mid-1980s he twice traveled to Japan to participate in the peace conferences organized by the religious organizations of Japan.

In the late 1980s, with the improving relationships between the Soviet Union and the United States, the idea of "public diplomacy" gained popularity as an effective means of removing tension in the world. As a result, possibilities emerged for meetings with the public figures from the Soviet Union. Kulakov, as one of the religious leaders, was invited to attend the International Chautauqua Conference on US-Soviet Relations, held in Chautauqua, NY., August 24–28, 1987.

In October 1987, Kulakov was invited to join the Governing Board of the Soviet Children's Fund, where he had the opportunity to collaborate with the Russian writer and chairman of the Fund, Albert Likhanov, in achieving the goals of the foundation.

On September 26, 1990, Kulakov, along with the head of the Russian Orthodox Church Patriarch Alexy II, was invited to the session of the Supreme Soviet of the U.S.S.R. (highest legislative body). It was there that he was able to outline his views on the new draft of the law for freedom of religion. At the end of 1990, Kulakov had a third meeting with the President of the Soviet Union Mikhail Gorbachev at the Kremlin regarding the religious freedom in the U.S.S.R.  Gorbachev at the time was seeking the support of religious leaders of the country.

Having personally lived through persecution for his religious beliefs, Kulakov was a constant voice in defense of religious freedom and actively participated in the international conferences on the protection of religious freedom. In 1990, he initiated the establishment of the Russian branch of the International Association for Religious Freedom International Religious Liberty Association. He was then elected Secretary General of the Russian branch of the association and acted as its representative to the Public Chamber of the Russian President from 1993 to 1995. Together with the priest Alexander Borisov, Kulakov also took part in the establishment of the Russian Bible Society .

One of Kulakov's favorite biblical passages was: "Where the Spirit of the Lord is, there is liberty" (II Epistle to Corinthians 3:17). Throughout his lifetime, he worked to create a dialogue between all groups of people and create an atmosphere of spiritual and intellectual freedom toward a common good. In a recent interview, Kulakov stated:

"Today I am greatly concerned about the underestimation of the importance of freedom of the individual. We have come through a very dark time when as if with the asphalt roller they tried to crush all individuality and to stifle the freedom of expression. It is impossible to forget that, and we should never forget it! These lessons should be remembered by those who care about the welfare of their native country, about their own children and the future generations. Each of us should think about the kind of foundations that we are laying today. So that the people of Russia could live a full life, filled with joy, with a sense of peace, and free from the fear that you will be silenced, oppressed and exterminated just because you desired to speak freely. This is crucial. This is what can save us as a nation and as a country from the horrors that we experienced in the twentieth century.

Establishment of the Institute for Bible Translation 

In 1992, Kulakov submitted his resignation as head of the Church in order to devote himself to translating the Bible into the modern Russian language.  Kulakov established the Institute for Bible Translation with the goal of completing a translation of the Russian Bible that is free from denominational bias. To achieve this goal, he invited a wide range of specialists from different denominations to work with him on the project.

For some time, Kulakov combined this activity with his responsibility as the Secretary General of the Russian Branch of the International Association for Religious Freedom as well as teaching courses in homiletics at Zaoksky Theological Seminary. However, he had to give up other activities to complete the translation of the New Testament. In April 2000, the Institute completed work on the New Testament and published the first edition of the New Testament in Modern Russian Translation. All 12,500 copies in circulation sold out that year and by popular demand it has been republished.

That same year, at the General Conference of the Seventh-day Adventist Church Session in Toronto, Mikhail P. Kulakov presented the New Testament to the delegates at the World Seventh-day Adventist Congress, and it was decided that he should continue working on the translation of the remainder of the Bible.  Kulakov moved to the United States with his wife in December 2000. Several years later a second edition of the New Testament and Psalms in the modern Russian translation, as well as the Five Books of Moses, and the books of Daniel and the Minor Prophets  were published. In August 2001,  Andrews University awarded Mikhail P. Kulakov a second honorary doctorate in theology for his contribution to the translation of the Scriptures.

Final years and death 

Though Kulakov lived the remainder of his life in California, he continued to visit Russia to conduct conferences and business meetings with the staff of his Bible Translation Institute at Zaoksky Theological Seminary. In autumn of 2009, Kulakov was diagnosed with brain cancer and underwent treatment at Loma Linda University Hospital.

He died of brain cancer on February 10, 2010 at his home in Highland, California. On the day of his death, the new Russian translation of the Pentateuch to which he devoted the last five years of his life was printed at Zaoksky. In May 2010, at its annual session, the Board of Trustees of the Institute for Bible Translation at Zaoksky agreed to name the institute after Kulakov.

Mikhail P. Kulakov was buried at  The Glenwood Cemetery in Washington, DC.
.

Resources 
http://www.legacy.com/obituaries/washingtonpost/obituary.aspx?n=mikhail-p-kulakov&pid=141342721#fbLoggedOut
http://www.goodreads.com/book/show/4253297-though-the-heavens-fall
"Recent Developments in Soviet Seventh-Day Adventism" - Occasional Papers on Religion in Eastern Europe
http://www.ministrymagazine.org/archive/1987/March/religion-and-communism
Kulakov secretly operated Adventist work in former Soviet Union
1519 Church News--Religious Freedom
https://archive.today/20130117220805/http://sda.biggytv.com/watch/really_living_038_mikhail_p_kulakov/really_living/
Kulakov Mikhail M. God's Soviet Miracles: How Adventists built the first Protestant seminary in Russian History. Boise, Idaho: Pacific Press Publishing Association, 1993.
Lohne, Alf. Adventists in Russia. Washington, DC: Review and Herald Publishing Association, 1987.
Antic Oxana. “More Persecution of Soviet Adventists”. Spectrum 2 (1985): 39–41.
Daffern Gene. The Church in the USSR: A Conversation with Hegstad. Spectrum 11:4 (1981): 42–45.
Fitzpatrick C. “Adventist Prisoners in the Soviet Gulag”. Spectrum 19:2 (1988): 41–43.
Gerber R. “Report on a Trip Through Russia”. Review and Herald (November 15, 1956): 16–26.
Kulakov, Michael P. Spectrum, Vol. 8 (1978) No. 3.
 Kulakov M . When the KGB came calling. Liberty. 1994. № 1 pp. 14–20
Wilson Neal C. “Proposals for Peace and Understanding”. Spectrum 19:2 (1988): 44–48.
Kolarz, W.Religion in the Soviet Union, London, 1961.
Murrey K. “Soviet Seventh-day Adventists,” Religion in Communist Lands 5:2 (Summer 1977).
Sapiets M. True Witness: The Story of Seventh day Adventists in the Soviet Union. England: A Keston College Publication, 1990.
Mikhail Kulakov Sr. with Maylan Schurch. Though the Heavens Fall. — Review & Herald Publishing, 2008.
Galina Stele, Lessons of God's providence: 125 years of the Seventh-day Adventist Church in the Euro-Asia Division. Ministry, October 2011.

References 

1927 births
2010 deaths
Translators of the Bible into Russian
Russian biblical scholars
Seventh-day Adventist ministers
Seventh-day Adventist administrators
History of the Seventh-day Adventist Church
Russian Seventh-day Adventists
20th-century translators
Seventh-day Adventist biblical scholars
20th-century Christian biblical scholars